Ivan Kuznetsov may refer to:

 Ivan Sergeyevich Kuznetsov (1867–1942), Russian architect
 Ivan Kuznetsov (sledge hockey) (born 1986), Russian sledge hockey player
 Ivan Kuznetsov (skier) (born 1996), Russian alpine skier
 Ivan Kuznetsov (actor) (1909-1976), Russian actor